Wang Xinxin is the name of:

Wang Xinxin (musician) (born 1965), Chinese-born performer of nanguan music
Wang Xinxin (footballer) (born 1981), Chinese association footballer and coach
Wang Xinxin (beach volleyball) (born 1998), Chinese beach volleyball player